Barrie may refer to:

People with the surname
 Alex Barrie (1878–1918), Scottish footballer
 Amanda Barrie (born 1935), British television and film actress
 Barbara Barrie (born 1931), American actress and author of children's books
 Charles Coupar Barrie, 1st Baron Abertay (1875–1940), British Liberal Party Member of Parliament (1918–40)
 Chris Barrie (born 1960), British actor and vocal impressionist
 Chris Barrie (admiral) (born 1945), Australian Admiral, Chief of Australian Defence Force (1998–2002)
 Fred Barrie, co-author of the Veronica search engine
 J. J. Barrie (born 1933), Canadian musician
 J. M. Barrie (1860–1937), Scottish novelist and dramatist; creator of Peter Pan
 John Barrie (actor) (1917–80), British actor in TV police dramas
 Ken Barrie (1933–2016), professional name of Leslie Hulme, British voice actor, narrator of Postman Pat
 Mardi Barrie (1930-2004), Scottish artist
Mohamed Bailor Barrie  (1934 – 1989) was a prominent businessman in Sierra Leone's diamond trade in the 70s and 80s
 Mona Barrie (1909–64), English actress in American theatre and motion pictures
 Robert Barrie (1774–1841), British naval officer in the War of 1812
 Scott Barrie (born 1962), Scottish Labour Party politician and former social worker
 Shirley Barrie (1945–2018), Canadian playwright
 Tyson Barrie (born 1991), professional ice hockey player
 Wendy Barrie (1912–78), English actress in British and Hollywood films

People with the given name
Barrie Cook (1929–2020), English painter
Barrie Lee Hall Jr. (1949–2011), American trumpeter 
Barrie Masters (1956–2019), English singer, frontman for the rock band Eddie and the Hot Rods
Professor Barrie Pettman, Baron of Bombie (born 1944), British author, publisher and philanthropist

People with the nickname
 Barrington Gerard "Barrie" Hole (1942-2019), Welsh footballer

See also 
 Barry (name)
 Barrie, Ontario, a city in central Ontario, Canada